Pentasteria is an extinct genus of sea star that lived from the Early Jurassic to the Early Cretaceous. Its fossils have been found in Europe.

Selected species
 Pentasteria boisteli
 Pentasteria elegans
 Pentasteria gataui
 Pentasteria liasica
 Pentasteria longispina
 Pentasteria recta
 Pentasteria tithonica

Sources

 Fossils (Smithsonian Handbooks) by David Ward (Page 186)

External links
Pentasteria in the Paleobiology Database

Astropectinidae
Prehistoric starfish genera
Jurassic echinoderms
Cretaceous echinoderms
Prehistoric echinoderms of Europe
Early Jurassic genus first appearances
Early Cretaceous genus extinctions